The Senior CLASS Award is presented each year to the outstanding senior NCAA Division I Student-Athlete of the Year in football at the Football Bowl Subdivision (FBS) level. The award was established in 2009 after being successfully implemented with collegiate men's and women's basketball, baseball, softball, men's ice hockey, men's lacrosse, and men's and women's soccer.  The inaugural winner was James Laurinaitis of Ohio State.

References

External links
 

College football national player awards
Senior CLASS Award foot
Awards established in 2008